Filatima aulaea is a moth of the family Gelechiidae. It is found in North America, where it has been recorded from Washington, Idaho, Wyoming and California.

References

Moths described in 1932
Filatima